Hell With the Lid Off, released in 1990 (see 1990 in music), is the first album by MC 900 Ft. Jesus collaborating with DJ Zero (see MC 900 Ft. Jesus § Career).

Hell With the Lid Off was released on Nettwerk Records. It has a heaven-and-hell theme to it, and track titles repeatedly mention such topics as God, heaven, and angels.  The songs themselves are often about mental illness, UFOs, voodoo, and violence; the comic delivery and tongue-in-cheek lyrics put this far outside the norm for a typical Nettwerk release. The album is sample-laden, and has a hip hop feel to it, though it shares little with that genre either.

Track listing
(all songs written by Griffin, except where noted)
"A Greater God" – 2:52 (Chaney/Chaney)
"Real Black Angel" – 4:21
"Truth is Out of Style" – 5:43
"UFO's Are Real" – 5:21
"Shut Up" – 5:42
"I'm Going Straight to Heaven" – 4:03
"Spaceman" – 6:55
"Talking to the Spirits" – 6:31
"Too Bad" – 5:33
"A Place of Loneliness" – 0:47
"Born with Monkey Asses" ^ – 5:43
"Straight to Heaven" (instrumental) ^ – 4:04

^ CD-only bonus tracks

References 

1990 debut albums
MC 900 Ft. Jesus albums
Nettwerk Records albums